Miha Škedelj (born May 29, 1999 in Novo Mesto, Slovenia) is a Slovenian professional basketball player for Krka of the Slovenian League. He is a 2.02 m tall small forward.

Professional career
Škedelj started playing professional basketball for Krka.

International career
Škedelj made his debut for the Slovenian national team on February 22, 2019, at the 2019 FIBA Basketball World Cup qualification game against Turkey national team.

References

External links
 Eurobasket.com profile
 REALGM profile
 FIBA profile

1999 births
Living people
KK Krka players
Slovenian men's basketball players
Small forwards